Rotello is a surname. Notable people with the surname include:

Gabriel Rotello (born 1953), American activist and writer
Michael V. Rotello (born 1952), American politician
Vincent Rotello, American materials scientist and engineer

See also
Rotelli